The 2018–19 FC Ufa season was their fifth successive season in the Russian Premier League, the highest tier of association football in Russia, and sixth in total.

Season events
During pre-season, manager Sergei Semak left by mutual consent, to become manager of Zenit St.Petersburg. On 13 June, Sergei Tomarov was appointed as the club's new manager, but resigned on 7 November 2018 being replaced by Dmitri Kirichenko. Kirichenko left Ufa by mutual consent on 27 March,  with Vadim Evseev becoming Ufa's third manager of the season on the same day.

Squad

Out on loan

Transfers

In

Out

Loans in

Loans out

Released

Friendlies

Competitions

Russian Premier League

Results by round

Results

League table

Relegation play-offs

Russian Cup

UEFA Europa League

Qualifying rounds

Squad statistics

Appearances and goals

|-
|colspan="14"|Players away from the club on loan:

|-
|colspan="14"|Players who left Ufa during the season:

|}

Goal scorers

Disciplinary record

References

External links

FC Ufa seasons
Ufa
Ufa